Chuspi or Chuspic (possibly from Quechua for insect, generic name of flies or two-winged insects; fly,) is a  mountain in the north of the Huallanca mountain range in the Andes of Peru. It is located in the Ancash Region, Bolognesi Province, in the districts of Aquia and Huallanca.

References 

Mountains of Peru
Mountains of Ancash Region
Lakes of Peru
Lakes of Ancash Region